Rahimpur is a village in Nakodar in Jalandhar district of Punjab State, India. The village is administered by Sarpanch an elected representative of the village.

Transport 
Nakodar railway station is the nearest train station.

References 

Villages in Jalandhar district
Villages in Nakodar tehsil